The Canal Henri IV is a section of the Canal de Briare that connects the Loire to the remainder of the Canal de Briare in Briare. It joins the Canal de Briare at the same point as the Canal latéral à la Loire.

See also
 List of canals in France
 Canal de Briare

References

Henri IV